Athletics competitions at the 1987 South Pacific Games were held at the Stade Numa-Daly Magenta in Nouméa, New Caledonia, between December 9–18, 1987.

A total of 38 events were contested, 22 by men and 16 by women.

Medal summary
Medal winners and their results were published on the Athletics Weekly webpage
courtesy of Tony Isaacs and Børre Lilloe, and on the Oceania Athletics Association webpage by Bob Snow.

Complete results can also be found on the Oceania Athletics Association webpage by Bob Snow.

Men

†: Albert Miller’s score of 7019 points in Decathlon was achieved with a wind assisted (+5.2 m/s) Long Jump of 6.82m.  Taking his best legal jump of 6.69m (+2.1) his score becomes 6989 points - a New Games Record.

Women

Medal table (unofficial)

Participation (unofficial)
Athletes from the following 11 countries were reported to participate:

 
 
 
/
 
 
 
 Northern Mariana Islands
 
 
/

References

External links
Pacific Games Council
Oceania Athletics Association

Athletics at the Pacific Games
Athletics in New Caledonia
South Pacific Games
1987 in New Caledonia
1987 Pacific Games